Kreis Schwetz was a Prussian district that existed from 1818 to 1920, with its capital at Schwetz. The district was located on the western bank of the Vistula river in the part of West Prussia that fell to Poland after the First World War through the Treaty of Versailles in 1920.

History 
The area of the Schwetz district belonged to the State of the Teutonic Order since 1309 until 1466, after which the region became part of Royal Prussia, which was under the Polish Crown. In 1569, Royal Prussia was fully integrated into the Kingdom of Poland.

The area of the Schwetz district became part of the Kingdom of Prussia with the First Partition of Poland in 1772 and belonged to the Konitz district until 1818. In 1815, the area became part of Regierungsbezirk Marienwerder in the province of West Prussia. As part of a comprehensive district reform, the new Schwetz district was formed on April 1, 1818, with its capital at Schwetz.

With the signing of the Treaty of Versailles after World War I, the Schwetz district had to be ceded by Germany to Poland on January 10, 1920 for the purpose of establishing the Polish Corridor. After the invasion of Poland in 1939 and the annexation of the territory by Nazi Germany, the district became part of the new Regierungsbezirk Bromberg in Reichsgau Danzig-West Prussia. Towards the end of World War II, the district was occupied by the Red Army in the spring of 1945 and was restored to Poland.

Demographics 
The district of Schwetz had a mixed population of Germans and Poles.

Politics

District administrators 

 1827–1829:  Sartorius von Schwanenfeld
 1829–1850:  Raimund von Pape
 1850–1867:  Richard Wegner
 1867–1870:  Hans von Zedlitz-Leipe
 1870–1874:  Wilhelm Woldeck von Arneburg
 1874–1897:  Gustav Gerlich
 1897–1903:  Hans Grashoff
 1903–1916:  Gustav Adolf von Halem
 1916–1919:  Friedrich Frankenbach
 1919–1920:  Werner Zschintzsch

Reichstag elections 
In the German Empire, the Schwetz district formed the Marienwerder 5 Reichstag constituency. In all Reichstag elections, this constituency was closely contested between German and Polish candidates. The respective winners only prevailed with narrow majorities:

 1871:  Gustav Gerlich, National Liberal Party
 1874:  Erazm Parczewski, Polish Party
 1877:  Franz August von Gordon, German Conservative Party
 1878:  Franz August von Gordon, German Conservative Party
 1881:  Boleslaw von Kossowski, Polish Party
 1884:  Franz August von Gordon, German Conservative Party
 1887:  Otto Holtz, Free Conservative Party
 1890:  Otto Holtz, Free Conservative Party
 1893:  Otto Holtz, Free Conservative Party
 1898:  Otto Holtz, Free Conservative Party
 1903:  Otto Holtz, Free Conservative Party
 1907:  Julian von Saß-Jaworski, Polish Party
 1912:  Gustav Adolf von Halem, Free Conservative Party

Municipalities 
In 1912, the Schwetz district included the two towns of Neuenburg in Westpreußen and Schwetz, as well as 151 rural communities:

References 

Świecie County
States and territories disestablished in 1920
States and territories established in 1818
Schwetz